Hoseynabad-e Ardeshiri (also Romanized as Ḩoseynābād-e Ārdeshīri; also known as Ḩoseynābād) is a village in Sornabad Rural District, Hamaijan District, Sepidan County, Fars Province, Iran. At the 2006 census, its population was 110, in 25 families.

References 

Populated places in Sepidan County